Seoul City Women's Football Club (Korean: 서울시청 여자 축구단) is a South Korean women's football club based in Seoul.

Seoul WFC was founded in March 2004 and is owned by the Seoul Metropolitan Government. The club competes in the WK League, the top division of women's football in South Korea, and plays its home games at the Seoul World Cup Auxiliary Stadium.

Current squad

Backroom staff

Coaching staff
Manager:  Yoo Yeong-sil
Coach:  Ahn Tae-hwa
Coach:  Song Ah-ri
Goalkeeping coach:  Jo Jung-hee

Support staff
Fitness coach:  Kang Seol-hee

Source: Official website

Honours
WK League
Runners-up: 2013

Season-by-season records

See also
 Seoul FC
 Football in Seoul

References

External links

Women's football clubs in South Korea
Association football clubs established in 2004
Football clubs in Seoul
Sport in Seoul
WK League clubs
2004 establishments in South Korea